Srbice may refer to:

Srbice (Domažlice District)
Srbice (Teplice District)

See also
Srbica (disambiguation)